Spaghetti junction is a nickname applied to many road junctions (including a list of junctions).

Spaghetti Junction may also refer to:

 Spaghetti Junction, Birmingham, West Midlands, England
"Spaghetti Junction", a song by Outkast from the album Stankonia